Chen Shiju was an important political aide for China's former leader Hu Jintao. Chen served as Hu's secretary beginning in Guizhou 1986. Chen was the director of the Office of the General Secretary of the Chinese Communist Party under Hu Jintao from 2002 to 2012. Chen concurrently served as deputy director of the General Office of the Communist Party of China. In 2015 he held a concurrent post on deputy director of the CPC Central Guidance Committee on Ethical and Cultural Construction.

References

Hu Jintao
Year of birth missing (living people)
Living people
Chinese government officials